= Yerikoppa =

- Village
- Location in Karnataka, India Yerikoppa (India)
- Coordinates: 15.30623°N 75.02268°E
- Country: India
- State: Karnataka
- District: Dharwad
- Talukas: Dharwad taluk

Government
  - Type: Panchayat raj
  - Body: Gram panchayat

Population (2011)
  - Total: 1,541

Languages
  - Official: Kannada
- Time zone: UTC+5:30 (IST)
- PIN: 580114
- ISO 3166 code: IN-KA
- Vehicle registration: KA
- Website: karnataka.gov.in

Yerikoppa is a village in the southern state of Karnataka, India. It is located in the Dharwad taluk of Dharwad district. Yerikoppa is 8.5 km (5.3 mi) distance from its Taluk Main Town Dharwad. Yerikoppa is 5.9 km (3.7 mi) distance from its District Main City Dharwad and 388 km (241 mi) distance from its State Main City Bangalore.

== Demographics ==
As of the 2011 Census of India there were 299 households in Yerikoppa and a total population of 1,541 consisting of 802 males and 739 females. There were 187 children ages 0–6.

== See also ==
- Districts of Karnataka
